Pagbilao, officially the Municipality of Pagbilao,  is a 1st class municipality in the province of Quezon, Philippines. According to the 2020 census, it has a population of 78,700 people.

It is located on the northern shore of Tayabas Bay on Luzon, just east of Lucena, the provincial capital.

Etymology
The name of Pagbilao is said to have been derived from the Tagalog words pagpag (bamboo beds) and bilao (winnowing basket).

Geography

Barangays
Pagbilao is politically subdivided into 27 barangays.

Climate

Demographics

Economy 

Most of the vast lands of Pagbilao are mainly used for agricultural. These agricultural land are mostly coconut, rice and poultry farms. But some of these lands became industrial areas. Most of these industrial lands are ice plants, rice and oil mills which can be seen along the highway.

The Province of Quezon announced that they are planning to make an industrial park or economic zone in the Barangays of Alupaye and Bantigue of Pagbilao. It will really help the employment of the people of Quezon Province.

Commerce is also rapidly grown not only in the downtown area, but also spreading in the whole town. Commercial establishments are growing from Talipan up to downtown along the highway. La Suerte Mega Warehouse, the largest commercial center in town, is found in Alupaye, which most of the bus terminals can be found here.

Tourism is also growing in Pagbilao. There are many hotel and resorts can be found along the highway or in the beachfront of Barangay Bantigue, which has a great view of the islands of the town.

The DEPED-Division of Quezon Province has its main office in town. It is one of largest employers not only in Pagbilao, but the whole Quezon Province. The municipal government is also one of the top employers in town, which focuses on public services.

The Pagbilao Power Station, one of the Philippine's largest power plant stations, is found on Isla Grande in Pagbilao. It is said to be the largest employer in town.

Government

Elected officials
Municipal council (2019–2022):
Mayor: Shierre Ann Portes-Palicpic
Vice Mayor: Joseph C. Garcia
Councilors:
 Michael E. Martinez
 Manuel D. Luna
 Joahnnes R. Mercado 
 Aldrien R. Calabia
 Lolito M. Merle
 Apolinar R. Martinez
 Bernardita D. Ayaton
 Jacinto A. Piñon
 Wilfredo C. Zafra (ABC)
 Joseph Manuel G. Luce (SKMF)

Infrastructure

Transportation

The municipality is connected with Manila by the Pan-Philippine Highway. Until 2014, there were also daily rail services to and from Naga and Legazpi provided by the Philippine National Railways. A new Pagbilao station has already been set for construction under the PNR South Long Haul project, a reconstruction of the PNR South Main Line that passes through the area.

In order to spur development in the municipality, the Toll Regulatory Board declared Toll Road 5 the extension of South Luzon Expressway. A 420-kilometer, four lane expressway starting from the terminal point of the now under construction SLEX Toll Road 4 at Barangay Mayao, Lucena City in Quezon to Matnog, Sorsogon, near the Matnog Ferry Terminal. On August 25, 2020, San Miguel Corporation announced that they will invest the project which will reduce travel time from Lucena to Matnog from 9 hours to 5.5 hours.

Another expressway that will serve Pagbilao is the Quezon-Bicol Expressway (QuBEx), which will link between Lucena and San Fernando, Camarines Sur.

Communications
Pagbilao has numerous mobile phone, internet and cable services providers. The following are:

Education
Pagbilao has numerous primary and secondary educational institutions. The following are:

References

External links

Pagbilao Profile at PhilAtlas.com

[ Philippine Standard Geographic Code]
Philippine Census Information
Local Governance Performance Management System
Quezon Province Web Portal

Municipalities of Quezon